Francis Wilson (26 July 1970 – 28 October 2022) was an Irish Gaelic footballer, footballer and manager. During his playing days he lined out for several clubs including Crewe United, Cliftonville and Omagh Town. He also represented Lámh Dhearg and the Antrim senior football team.

Playing career
Wilson joined Lámh Dhearg as a 17-year-old and was part of the club's first ever Antrim MFC title-winning team in 1988. He won an Antrim SFC title in 1992. That same year Wilson was drafted onto the Antrim senior football team and lined out in the All-Ireland SBFC final defeat by Wicklow. Wilson continued to line out with Antrim for about a decade.

Wilson combined his Gaelic football career with that of a semi-professional footballer. Usually lining out at midfield, he played for Northern Ireland Football League clubs Crewe United, Cliftonville, Carrick Rangers, Ballyclare Comrades, Larne, Omagh Town and Bangor.

Managerial career
Wilson returned to the Bangor as manager and guided the club to the Steel & Sons Cup in 2011. He also had spells as manager of Lurgan Celtic, Sport and Leisure Swifts and Banbridge Town. Wilson was also the long-serving manager of the Northern Ireland national under-18 schoolboys football team.

Personal life and death
Wilson worked as a teacher, where he was head of the PE department at Our Lady and St Patrick's College in Knock. He was diagnosed with terminal bile duct cancer in January 2022. Wilson died on 28 October 2022, at the age of 52.

Honours

Player
Lámh Dhearg
Antrim Senior Football Championship: 1992
Antrim Minor Football Championship: 1988

Manager
Bangor
Steel & Sons Cup: 2011

References

1970 births
2022 deaths
Lámh Dhearg Gaelic footballers
Antrim inter-county Gaelic footballers
Gaelic footballers who switched code
Association football managers
Cliftonville F.C. players
Carrick Rangers F.C. players
Ballyclare Comrades F.C. players
Omagh Town F.C. players
Larne F.C. players
Bangor F.C. players
Bangor F.C. managers
Sport & Leisure Swifts F.C. managers